William Pendleton House (1913–1997) was an American climber. Bill was born in Pittsburgh, Pennsylvania on May 30, 1913 and died on December 18, 1997 in Peterborough, New Hampshire. In 1936, along with Fritz Wiessner, he and Wiessner became the first people to climb Mount Waddington in Canada, a mountain on which there had previously been sixteen unsuccessful attempts. On the 1938 American K2 expedition, he was the first to climb House's Chimney when he free-climbed it in 1938. It was subsequently named after him.

References

American mountain climbers
1913 births
1997 deaths